William Shand Caie (August 18, 1814 – October 3, 1873) was a Scottish-born merchant and political figure. He represented Kent County in the Legislative Assembly of New Brunswick from 1865 to 1873.

He was born in Nairn, the son of Robert Shand Caie and Isabella Low, came to New Brunswick with his parents and was educated in Miramichi. In 1840, he married Isabella Trider. Caie was also involved in shipping timber. He served in the local militia. In 1871, Caie was named to the province's Executive Council. He died in office in 1873.

References 
The Canadian parliamentary companion, HJ Morgan (1873)

1814 births
1873 deaths
Members of the Legislative Assembly of New Brunswick
Colony of New Brunswick people
Members of the Executive Council of New Brunswick
Scottish emigrants to pre-Confederation New Brunswick
People from Nairn
Businesspeople in timber